The following table displays the official flag, seal, and coat of arms of the 50 states, of the federal district, the 5 inhabited territories, and the federal government of the United States of America.


Table

The largest Native American tribes

Note that this is not a complete list of federally recognized tribes, and only represents some of the largest by population and reserved land area. See the Wikimedia links above for more symbols of Native American nations.

Historical seals

See also

Gallery of country coats of arms
Lists of U.S. state topics
Flags of the U.S. states
Coats of arms of the U.S. states

External links

Information about All States from UCB Libraries GovPubs
State Resource Guides, from the Library of Congress
Tables with areas, populations, densities and more (in order of population)
Tables with areas, populations, densities and more (alphabetical)
State and Territorial Governments on USA.gov
StateMaster – statistical database for U.S. states

Insignia

Insignia
Insignia